Sir John Stowford (c.1290 – c.1372) of Stowford, West Down in Devon, was Chief Baron of the Exchequer in 1346. He is one of John Prince's Worthies of Devon.

Origins
He was born at the family estate of Stowford in the parish of West Down in North Devon.

Career
It is not known at which Inn of Court he trained as a lawyer, but he was called to the bar and became a serjeant at law. In 1341 he was appointed King's Serjeant to King Edward III. In 1346 he was knighted and was appointed Chief Baron of the Exchequer. In 1349 he was appointed one of the Justices Itinerant for the county of Kent.

Builds Pilton Causeway

Stowford built Pilton Causeway which links the towns of Barnstaple and Pilton, which were then separated by the treacherous marshy ground in which flowed the tidal meanders of the small River Yeo. It is recounted by Prince that Stowford decided on building the causeway when on his way from his home at Stowford to Barnstaple, he met whilst fording the Yeo,  the drowned bodies of a  woman with her child. He is also believed to have contributed to the financing of the long-bridge in Barnstaple.

Marriage
He married Joan Tracy, a co-heiress of the Tracy family of Woolacombe Tracy, Devon.

Death and burial
He died at Stowford and was buried in the Stowford Chapel in the north transept of West Down Church, where survives his much-worn life-size effigy carved in oak, dressed in his robes of office, set on the floor under a low recessed arch set into the north wall. The colouring of the effigy was renewed in 1873, but no trace survives today.

Further reading
Dictionary of National Biography, 1885-1900, Volume 55, biography of Sir John StowfordStowford, John (DNB00)From Wikisource

Sources
 Prince, John, (1643–1723) The Worthies of Devon, 1810 edition, pp. 727–729, biography of Sir John Stowford

References

1290 births
1372 deaths
People from North Devon (district)
English barristers
Lawyers from Devon
Chief Barons of the Exchequer